Burm is an alternative spelling of berm, a landform. 

Burm may also refer to:

Kris Burm, Belgian game designer
Burm., taxonomic author abbreviation of Johannes Burman, botanist
Burm.f., taxonomic author abbreviation of Nicolaas Laurens Burman

See also
Burma, former name of Myanmar